Compass Light is a video production company based in Camden, Maine. The company coordinates production of high definition video, film and non-fiction programming, from story development and shooting to editing and distribution.

Work focuses on the discoveries of people in challenging and value-forming situations, primarily outdoors and in a marine context. The company grew out of the work of producer/director David Conover, and draws on an assembled network of marine production personnel.

Productions 
Behold The Earth - (2017)An inquiry into America's divorce from nature. It is a feature-length musical documentary film.

Sunrise Earth - (2004–present)Real-time observations of one sunrise habitat per episode draws on wonder of HD to make you a naturalist in your own living space.

Seasons one and two cover North America. In its third season, Sunrise Earth goes international, to Asia, Europe, Central and South America. The fourth season, airing on HD Theater in January, 2008, consists of locations chosen by the viewers themselves.

Cracking The Ocean Code - (2005)This HD production was shot in Panama, Cocos Island, and Galapagos with genome pioneer J. Craig Venter. It aired on The Science Channel and Discovery HD Theater.

Toad Warriors - (2005)Craig and Jackie Adams-Maher risk life and limb to save the king brown snake of Australia from a deadly invasive army: the cane toad. Cane toads possess a deadly poison that kills any animals in their path.

Without their help, the deadly king brown snake, a species that is essential in the production of life-saving antivenom, faces extinction.

(post-produced for David Wright and Lunasea, Inc.)

Film production companies of the United States
Companies based in Maine